During the 1986–87 season, the Scottish football club :Hibernian F.C. was placed 9th in the :Scottish Premier Division. The team reached the fourth round of both the :Scottish Cup and the :Scottish League Cup.

Overview
During the 1986 close season, Hibs sold Gordon Durie to Chelsea for £400,000, and brought in Billy Kirkwood, Stuart Beedie, Willie Irvine, Mark Caughey and George McCluskey. They played pre-season friendlies against Chelsea, as part of the deal for Durie, and Sevilla. Before the season started, Hibs manager John Blackley hoped to qualify for European competition and to have extended runs in the cup competitions.

In the opening-day victory over Rangers at Easter Road, after a Graeme Souness tackle on George McCluskey in the centre circle, for which he was sent off, the SFA retrospectively gave 21 players yellow cards for the on-pitch fighting that followed the tackle. Only Hibs' goalkeeper Alan Rough was spared, because he remained in his penalty area, although McCluskey and Mark Fulton successfully appealed against their cautions. 

Despite the win against Rangers, Hibs fell well short of Blackley's pre-season hopes. Blackley resigned in November and was subsequently replaced by Alex Miller, who at least prevented the club from falling into the relegation zone. A return game against Sevilla was played in December.

Scottish Premier Division

Final League table

Scottish League Cup

Scottish Cup

See also
List of Hibernian F.C. seasons

References

External links
Hibernian 1986/1987 results and fixtures, Soccerbase

Hibernian F.C. seasons
Hibernian